Beaufort West Local Municipality is a municipality located in Western Cape Province, South Africa.  the population is 49,586. Its municipality code is WC053.

Geography 
It is located in the furthest northeastern part of the province in the Great Karoo. It abuts on the Karoo Hoogland Municipality to the northwest, the Ubuntu Municipality to the north, the Dr Beyers Naudé Municipality to the southeast, the Prince Albert Municipality to the south and the Laingsburg Municipality to the southwest.

According to the 2011 census the municipality has a population of 49,586 people in 13,089 households. Of this population, 73.5% describe themselves as "Coloured", 16.3% as "African", and 9.2% as "White". The first language of 84.3% of the population is Afrikaans, while 10.7% speak Xhosa and 2.5% speak English.

The main town in the municipality is Beaufort West, which as of 2011 has a population of 34,085. Murraysburg (pop. 5,069) is situated in the far east of the municipality. Nelspoort (pop. 1,699) is situated northeast of Beaufort West, while Merweville (pop. 1,592) is in the far west of the municipality.

History
At the end of the apartheid era, the area that is today the Beaufort West Local Municipality was divided between two Regional Services Councils (RSCs): the western part around Beaufort West formed part of the Central Karoo RSC, while the eastern part around Murraysburg formed part of the Kamdeboo RSC. The towns of Beaufort West and Murraysburg were governed by municipal councils elected by their white residents, while the coloured residents of the towns were governed by management committees subordinate to the white councils. Kwa-Mandlenkosi was governed by a town council established under the Black Local Authorities Act, 1982.

After the national elections of 1994 a process of local government transformation began, in which negotiations were held between the existing local authorities, political parties, and local community organisations. As a result of these negotiations, the existing local authorities were dissolved and transitional local councils (TLCs) were created for each town and village. In December 1994 the Beaufort West TLC replaced the Municipality of Beaufort West, Beaufort West Management Committee and Kwa-Mandlenkosi Town Council. In January 1994 the Murraysburg TLC replaced the Municipality of Murraysburg and Murraysburg Management Committee. In June 1995 the Murraysburg district was removed from the Kamdeboo RSC and added to the Central Karoo RSC.

The transitional councils were initially made up of members nominated by the various parties to the negotiations, until May 1996 when elections were held. At these elections the Central Karoo District Council was established, replacing the Central Karoo RSC. Transitional representative councils (TRCs) were also elected to represent rural areas outside the TLCs on the District Council; the area that was to become Beaufort West Local Municipality included Beaufort West and Murraysburg TRCs.

At the local elections of December 2000 the transitional councils were dissolved. The Central Karoo District Council was replaced by the Central Karoo District Municipality. The Beaufort West Local Municipality was established as a single local authority covering the area of the Beaufort West TLC and TRC, except for the Karoo National Park which became a District Management Area (DMA). The area of the Murraysburg TLC and TRC also became a DMA. In 2011 DMAs were abolished and these areas were included into the Beaufort West Local Municipality.

Politics 

The municipal council consists of thirteen members elected by mixed-member proportional representation. Seven councillors are elected by first-past-the-post voting in seven wards, while the remaining six are chosen from party lists so that the total number of party representatives is proportional to the number of votes received. In the election of 1 November 2021 no party obtained a majority of seats on the council. The African National Congress (ANC) has formed a coalition with the Patriotic Alliance (PA) and the Karoo Democratic Force (KDF) to govern the municipality.

The following table shows the results of the 2021 election.

References

External links 
 

 
Local municipalities of the Central Karoo District Municipality
Karoo